Luis Jonne  (born 18 July 1975 in Montevideo) is a former Uruguayan footballer.

Career
Jonne began his football career with C.A. Cerro, eventually helping the club gain promotion to the Primera División Uruguaya and winning a cap with the Uruguay national football team. Following promotion, rivals Club Nacional de Football signed him on a six month deal.

International career
Jonne made one appearance for the senior Uruguay national football team, a friendly against Japan on 25 August 1996.

References

External links

1975 births
Living people
Uruguayan footballers
Uruguay international footballers
C.A. Cerro players
Club Nacional de Football players
Centro Atlético Fénix players
Central Español players
Miramar Misiones players
S.D. Quito footballers
Expatriate footballers in Ecuador
Uruguayan expatriate sportspeople in Ecuador
Footballers from Montevideo

Association football midfielders